Andrés Pérez de Lara González (born April 2, 2005) is a Mexican professional stock car racing driver. He completes full-time in the ARCA Menards Series, driving the No. 2 Chevrolet SS for Rev Racing. He is a former champion of the NASCAR Mikel's Truck Series, having won it in 2020. He has also competed in the NASCAR Mexico Series. He is also a champion of the NASCAR Mexico Challenge Series, having won it in 2022.

Racing career
In 2019, at the age of fourteen, Pérez de Lara would compete in the NACAM Formula 4 Championship alongside his brother, Pablo, at Telcel RPL Racing. He would go on to win four races, being the youngest to do so, on route to third in the championship and rookie of the year honors.

In 2020, Pérez de Lara would run in the NASCAR Mikel's Truck Series in Mexico, where he would win the championship at the age of fifteen.

In 2021, Pérez de Lara would run the full season in the NASCAR FedEx Challenge Series after running one race at Nuevo Autódromo de Quéretaro in the previous year. He would finish fourth in the points that year, finishing in the top five in eight races.

In 2022, Pérez de Lara would return to the series, where he would become the youngest winner in the series at Querétaro Race Track at the age of seventeen on route to win the championship. It was also during this year that Pérez de Lara was chosen for the NASCAR Drive for Diversity program, and he would also make select events in the ARCA Menards Series, ARCA Menards Series East and ARCA Menards Series West driving for David Gilliland Racing.

On January 13, 2023, it was announced that Pérez de Lara would run full-time in the ARCA Menards Series for Rev Racing in the No. 2 Chevrolet, replacing Nick Sanchez, who had won the championship the previous year. He was entered in the season opening race at Daytona International Speedway in the No. 01 Chevrolet for Fast Track Racing, but was withdrawn after practice due to age restrictions, although he would be placed in the final results as a "did not start" in 40th place.

Personal life
Pérez de Lara is the brother of Pablo Pérez de Lara, who is also racing driver whom he competed with in Formula 4. His father, Ricardo, is a former champion of the North American Ferrari Challenge Series and a former Ferrari World Champion in Abu Dhabi.

Motorsports results

Complete NACAM Formula 4 Championship results 
(key) (Races in bold indicate pole position) (Races in italics indicate fastest lap)

ARCA Menards Series 
(key) (Bold – Pole position awarded by qualifying time. Italics – Pole position earned by points standings or practice time. * – Most laps led.)

ARCA Menards Series East

ARCA Menards Series West

References

External links
 

Living people
2005 births
NASCAR drivers
ARCA Menards Series drivers
Racing drivers from Mexico City